Stefan Nikolić (born May 29, 1997) is a Serbian professional basketball player for Pallacanestro Cantù of the Italian Serie A2. Due to the Italian formation during his youth, he is considered an "homegrown player" in the Italian championship.

References

External links 
 Player profile at realgm.com
 Player profile at eurobasket.com

1997 births
Living people
Basketball players from Belgrade
Italian men's basketball players
Italian people of Serbian descent
KK Crvena zvezda youth players
Lega Basket Serie A players
Pallacanestro Cantù players
Serbian expatriate basketball people in Italy
Serbian men's basketball players
Small forwards
Virtus Bologna players
Napoli Basket players